The 1925 Campeonato Paulista was the 24th season of São Paulo's top association football league. The edition organized by the APEA (Associação Paulista de Esportes Atléticos) from April 19 to November 22. The top scorer was Feitiço with 10 goals.

System
The championship was disputed in a single round-robin system, with the team with the most points winning the title.

Championship

References

Campeonato Paulista seasons
Paulista